The Central District of Neka County is a district (bakhsh) in Neka County, Mazandaran Province, Iran. At the 2006 census, its population was 90,588, in 23,283 families.  The District has one city: Neka. The District has three rural districts (dehestan): Mehravan Rural District, Peyrajeh Rural District, and Qareh Toghan Rural District.

References 

Neka County
Districts of Mazandaran Province